Janowo-Cegielnia  is a settlement in the administrative district of Gmina Strzałkowo, within Słupca County, Greater Poland Voivodeship, in west-central Poland.

References

Janowo-Cegielnia